The 2011–12 FC Sion season started on 16 July 2011.

Review and events

Season

Transfer controversy

History
The controversy started when FC Sion signed Essam El-Hadary in 2008.

2011–12 Events
FC Sion originally drew 0-0 and won 3-1 against Celtic F.C. in the Europa League. However, UEFA overturned the results and awarded Celtic F.C. 3-0 forfeit victories for both legs of the tie. FC Sion lost their appeal to re-enter the competition.

The Swiss Football Association deducted 36 points from FC Sion. Three points were deducted for each of the 12 league and cup matches in which one or more of the six ineligible players appeared. The 36 points deduction left FC Sion in last place and minus 5 points. FIFA had threatened to suspend the Swiss Football Association if there was no action against FC Sion. This meant that all national teams and clubs under the jurisdiction of the Swiss Football Association would not be allowed to participate in any FIFA and UEFA competition.

Squad

Match results

Legend

Super League

Table

Relegation play-off

Sion won 3 – 1 on aggregate.

Swiss Cup

UEFA Europa League

1. FC Sion originally drew 0–0 in the first leg and won 3–1 in the second leg. UEFA overturned the result of both matches. Both matches were awarded 3–0 in favour of Celtic F.C.

Squad statistics

Appearances and goals

|-
|colspan="14"|Players away from the club on loan:

|-
|colspan="14"|Players who appeared for Sion no longer at the club:

|}

Top Scorers

Disciplinary Record

Sources

FC Sion seasons
Sion
Sion